James Wallis (born 13 June 1974 in London, Greater London) is a male former English field hockey midfielder.

Hockey career
Wallis was a member of the British squad that finished ninth at the 2004 Summer Olympics in Athens, Greece. Wallis was also a member of Team GB at the 2000 Summer Olympics in Sydney. Wallis, nicknamed Wal, "Kipper" and Ratty, played club hockey for Teddington Hockey Club and Surbiton Hockey Club. He made his debut for England in 1995. He represented England and won a bronze medal, at the 1998 Commonwealth Games in Kuala Lumpur.

Personal life
He now works as a hockey coach and Physics teacher at Reed's School in Surrey. He plays golf competitively, has played for the Surrey County Golf Union First Team and reached his lowest handicap in 2012 (plus 2). In 2014 he finished tied first at The Open Championship Regional Qualifying tournament at Hankley Common GC with a 3-under par score of 68.

References

 Profile on Athens 2004 website

External links

1974 births
Living people
English male field hockey players
Male field hockey midfielders
Olympic field hockey players of Great Britain
Field hockey players at the 2000 Summer Olympics
Field hockey players at the 2004 Summer Olympics
Sportspeople from London
1998 Men's Hockey World Cup players
2002 Men's Hockey World Cup players
Commonwealth Games bronze medallists for England
Commonwealth Games medallists in field hockey
Surbiton Hockey Club players
Teddington Hockey Club players
Field hockey players at the 1998 Commonwealth Games
Medallists at the 1998 Commonwealth Games